Angarosphecidae is an extinct family of Mesozoic and early Cenozoic wasps in the superfamily Apoidea.

Genera 

 †Angarosphex Rasnitsyn 1975 Weald Clay, United Kingdom, Hauterivian/Barremian La Pedrera de Rúbies Formation, Spain, Barremian Crato Formation, Brazil, Aptian Laiyang Formation, Yixian Formation, China, Aptian Gurvan-Eren Formation, Mongolia, Aptian Zaza Formation, Turga Formation, Russia, Aptian Sinuiju Formation, North Korea, Aptian
†Baissodes Rasnitsyn 1975 Weald Clay, United Kingdom, Hauterivian Yixian Formaiton, China, Aptian Gurvan-Eren Formation, Mongolia, Aptian Zaza Formation, Russia, Aptian
 †Burmasphex Melo and Rosa, 2018, Burmese amber, Myanmar, Cenomanian
†Cretobestiola Pulawski and Rasnitsyn 2000 La Pedrera de Rúbies Formation, Spain, Barremian Crato Formation, Brazil, Aptian, Dzun-Bain Formation, Mongolia, Aptian Zaza Formation, Argun Formation, Russia, Aptian
 †Cretosphecium Pulawski and Rasnitsyn 2000 Dzun-Bain Formation, Mongolia, Aptian  
 †Decasphex Zheng et al 2020, Burmese amber, Myanmar, Cenomanian
†Eosphecium Pulawski and Rasnitsyn 2000 Ootsa Lake Group, Coldwater Beds, Canada, Ypresian
†Eubaissodes Zhang 1992 Laiyang Formation, China, Aptian
†Ilerdosphex Rasnitsyn 2000 La Pedrera de Rúbies Formation, Spain, Barremian 
†Mesorhopalosoma Darling 1990 Crato Formation, Brazil, Aptian
†Montsecosphex Rasnitsyn and Martínez-Delclòs 2000 La Pedrera de Rúbies Formation, Spain, Barremian 
†Oryctobaissodes Rasnitsyn 1975 Zaza Formation, Russia, Aptian
†Paleorhopalosoma Nel et al. 2010 Menat Formation, France, Paleocene
†Pompilopterus Rasnitsyn 1975  Weald Clay, United Kingdom, Hauterivian/Barremian La Pedrera de Rúbies Formation, Spain, Barremian, Zaza Formation, Russia, Aptian, Sinuiju Formation, North Korea, Aptian
†Vitimosphex Rasnitsyn 1975 Zaza Formation, Russia, Aptian
Undescribed specimens are known from the Cenomanian aged Burmese amber of Myanmar.

References 

Apoidea
Prehistoric insect families